Kill Me Please may refer to:
 Kill Me Please (2010 film), a French-Belgian comedy film
 Kill Me Please (2015 film), a teen thriller drama film